Thaumatichthys pagidostomus is a species of wonderfish found in the Indian and Atlantic Oceans at a depth of around .  This species grows to a length of  TL.  This species has relatively longer premaxillaries than the other species (measuring 33% of standard length), and the anterior premaxillary teeth are long.

References
 

Thaumatichthyidae
Fish described in 1912